Annette Jacky Messomo (born 1 March 1993) is a footballer who plays as a midfielder for Kosovan Women's Football League club KFF A&N. Born and raised in Cameroon, she is a naturalized citizen of Equatorial Guinea and has played for that women's national team.

Early life
Messomo was born in Ebolowa, into an Eton family. She grew up in Cameroon where she fell in love with football. She has played football since she was 6 years old, mostly with co-ed teams, due to Cameroon not having an organized structure for women's football.

Club career
Messomo has played for Franck Rholiceck Douala, Louves Minproff Yaoundé and Panthère Security Garoua in Cameroon. She has made appearances at the UEFA Women's Champions League for FK Union Nové Zámky, ŽFK Spartak Subotica and BIIK Kazygurt, clubs from Slovakia, Serbia and Kazakhstan, respectively.

International career 
Despite being born in Cameroon, whose women's national football team had pre-called up her in March 2014, Messomo began to play for Equatorial Guinea in 2016. She had previously been called up for them in 2011.

In September 2018, Messomo was declared by FIFA as ineligible to play for Equatorial Guinea because there were allegations of her not being eligible to represent Equatorial Guinea since she was born in Cameroon. The decision was later overruled by the Appeal Board of CAF.

Personal life
In 2015, Messomo began studying at University of Yaoundé II, pursuing a degree in Business administration.

References

1993 births
Living people
People from Ebolowa
Cameroonian women's footballers
Women's association football midfielders
FC Energy Voronezh players
FK Union Nové Zámky players
ŽFK Spartak Subotica players
BIIK Kazygurt players
Cameroonian expatriate women's footballers
Cameroonian expatriate sportspeople in Russia
Expatriate women's footballers in Russia
Cameroonian expatriate sportspeople in Slovakia
Expatriate women's footballers in Slovakia
Cameroonian expatriate sportspeople in Serbia
Expatriate women's footballers in Serbia
Cameroonian expatriate sportspeople in Kazakhstan
Expatriate women's footballers in Kazakhstan
Cameroonian expatriate sportspeople in the United States
Expatriate women's soccer players in the United States

Expatriate footballers in Kosovo
Naturalized citizens of Equatorial Guinea
Equatoguinean women's footballers
Equatorial Guinea women's international footballers